David Eli Fish is an American physiatrist and one of the editors of a popular PM&R handbook PM&R Pocketpedia.

Education
After completing a residency in physical medicine and rehabilitation at the Johns Hopkins University School of Medicine in 2001, Fish completed additional training as a clinical fellow in pain medicine at UCLA School of Medicine.  Fish is a Professor in the Orthopaedic Department Clinic  at UCLA School of Medicine.

Awards
Fish is the recipient of the following:

 Foundation for PM&R Education Research Fund's Best Paper Award (2004).
 Fish's work demonstrated that there is no statistically significant difference between two competing approaches to achieve muscle strengthening.
 Distinguished Clinician (2002), UCLA/VA Multicampus PM&R Residency Program        		
 Selected by residents as the distinguished staff attending for the academic year.
 Teaching Excellence in Problem Based Learning, UCLA School of Medicine (2007)

Articles

Books
 Choi H, Sugar R, Fish D, Shatzer M, Krabak B. PM&R Pocketpedia. Lippincott Williams and Wilkins (2003). 
 Kim H, Fish D, Choi H.  Pain Medicine Pocketpedia. Lippincott Williams and Wilkins (2011).

References

American psychiatrists
Living people
David Geffen School of Medicine at UCLA faculty
Johns Hopkins School of Medicine alumni
1964 births